Trinity Academy, formerly Trinity Academy of Raleigh, is a classical, Christian school located in Raleigh, North Carolina. The headmaster is Timothy Bridges.

History 
Trinity Academy was founded in September 1995 by a board of directors. In 1998, Trinity Academy of Raleigh was formed when Trinity Academy (a high school) and Regent School of Raleigh (K–8) merged. Originally, the two divisions were on different campuses: (Asbury United Methodist Church and Calvary Presbyterian Church). In 2002, the entire school moved to Providence Baptist Church, and then again in 2005 to 10224 Baileywick Road campus where the school resides today.

References

1995 establishments in North Carolina
Christian schools in North Carolina
Classical Christian schools
Educational institutions established in 1995
Private elementary schools in North Carolina
Private high schools in North Carolina
Private middle schools in North Carolina
Private schools in Raleigh, North Carolina